The 2005 Louisiana–Monroe Indians football team represented the University of Louisiana at Monroe in the 2005 NCAA Division I-A football season. The Indians offense scored 239 points while the defense allowed 339 points. It was the final season in which Louisiana–Monroe used the nickname of Indians. Louisiana–Monroe adopted its current nickname of Warhawks beginning with the 2006–07 school year.

Schedule

References

Louisiana–Monroe
Louisiana–Monroe Warhawks football seasons
Sun Belt Conference football champion seasons
Louisiana–Monroe Indians football